Máté Kanász-Nagy (born 3 October 1986) is a Hungarian politician, who has been a member of the National Assembly since 2022. He was the male co-leader of the LMP – Hungary's Green Party from 2020 to 2022, serving with the female co-leader Erzsébet Schmuck.

Career 
He has been living in Újpest since he was three years old. He graduated in 2010 as a sociologist at Eötvös Loránd University. He has been an active party member since 2010 in the newly formed LMP. From 2011 he worked  as a consultant for the Possible Other in the Politics Group. In 2015 He became the LMP Youth spokesman, and from 2017 he continued as the spokesman of the LMP. In May 2018, the Congress of the LMP in Székesfehérvár elected him the Secretary of the National Presidency of the LMP.

He ran in several municipal elections in Újpest. In November 2014, the LMP launched a campaign in the Újpest by-elections, led by Kanász-Nagy. In the 2018 parliamentary elections in Hungary, he was the LMP's a candidate in the 11th OEVK in Budapest and 8th on the LMP's national list.

In the 2019 local elections, he was elected as an individual district representative to the Újpest District Assembly, and was elected as the deputy mayor of Újpest responsible for public welfare affairs by the majority of the assembly.

On August 30, 2020, the Fiftieth Congress of LMP elected him to be the male co-leader of the party, replacing János Kendernay. Kanász-Nagy was elected a Member of Parliament via the joint electoral list of the United for Hungary in the 2022 parliamentary election. He became a member of the Legislative Committee. Kanász-Nagy did not run for presidency in the August 2022 party leadership electoral congress. He was replaced as male co-chair by Péter Ungár.

References

1986 births
Living people
Eötvös Loránd University alumni
LMP – Hungary's Green Party politicians
Members of the National Assembly of Hungary (2022–2026)